Ivan Pozhidayev (3 September 1919 – 2 November 2013) was a Russian long-distance runner who competed in the 1952 Summer Olympics.

References

1919 births
2013 deaths
Russian male long-distance runners
Soviet male long-distance runners
Olympic athletes of the Soviet Union
Athletes (track and field) at the 1952 Summer Olympics